BP Circini is a binary star system in the southern constellation of Circinus. It is located at a distance of approximately 3,300 light years from the Sun based on parallax.

The variability of this star was discovered by D. W. Kurtz in 1979. A small-amplitude Cepheid variable, its apparent magnitude ranges from 7.37 to 7.71 over 2.39810 days. A spectroscopic binary, the primary is a yellow-white bright giant of spectral type F2 or F3II. The spectrum shows peculiarities in the metallic lines.  The secondary is a 4.7 solar mass blue-white main sequence star of spectral type B6.

References

F-type bright giants
B-type main-sequence stars
Classical Cepheid variables
Circinus (constellation)
Durchmusterung objects
129708
072264
Circini, BP
Spectroscopic binaries